The Saskatchewan Potato Utility Development Company (SPUDCO) was a public–private partnership between SaskWater and Lake Diefenbaker Potato Corporation (LDPC). It was created in 1996 and had signs of trouble from the start. The fallout from the numerous scandals led to the bankruptcy of LDPC and subsequent lawsuit which was settled for $7.9 million CAD and a Royal Canadian Mounted Police (RCMP) investigation. SPUDCO folded in 2000.

See also
2003 Saskatchewan general election
Saskatchewan New Democratic Party

References

External links

Former Crown corporations of Canada
Crown corporations of Saskatchewan